Nigeria Olympic Games competition is under the auspices of its Nigerien Olympic and National Sports Committee (COSNI). From 2014 on, its president is Issaka Idé. A member of the Association of National Olympic Committees of Africa, the Niger committee was founded in 1964.

See also
Niger at the Olympics

References

 

Niger
Niger at the Olympics
Oly